Serhat Zübeyr Koruk (born 4 May 1996) is a German-Turkish professional footballer who plays as a forward for SV Straelen.

Career
In January 2022 Koruk agreed the termination of his contract with 3. Liga club SV Meppen for "personal reasons".

On 18 January 2022, Koruk signed with SC Verl.

References

External links
 

1996 births
Living people
German footballers
German people of Turkish descent
Footballers from Cologne
Association football forwards
Bonner SC players
SC Fortuna Köln players

Diyarbakırspor footballers

SV Bergisch Gladbach 09 players
SV Meppen players
SC Verl players
SV 19 Straelen players
3. Liga players
Regionalliga players
TFF Second League players
TFF Third League players